Chrome Dome may refer to:

Chrome dome, a case of hair loss to where a person goes bald
Chrome Dome, a fictional character a.k.a. Mr. Cooper in Sweet Valley High novels
Chrome Dome, a fictional character debuting in season 5 of Teenage Mutant Ninja Turtles
Chrome Dome Empire, a fictional organization in Cyber City setting for comics
Chromedome (Transformers), a fictional character in the Transformers universe
A nickname for either Cobra Commander or Destro in the G.I. Joe universe
A nickname for Mr RH Allen legendary librarian of Dartford Boys Grammar School (now deceased)
Professor Chromedome, in The Tick comics

See also
Operation Chrome Dome, a U.S. Cold-War strategic-bomber program